is a 1991 video game for the Game Gear handheld console. It involves robots fighting in combat sequences.

Gameplay

The object is to earn more gold by winning matches and spending that money on better weapons like rifles, missile launchers, and flamethrowers. Robots can be traded in for money (gold) if updating them is impossible. At the center of each starting point is a base (circle). Either the base must be destroyed or all the opponent's robots must be destroyed in order to clear the battlefield. There is a certain range to each weapon; opponents cannot be attacked if they are too close or too far away from the weapon's firing range.

There are ten different maps in the game. Each level has its own password. Players must deliver newspapers for a tiny stipend in order to resume competing after a loss.

Development
The beta version of Head Buster had a different readout of the battle along with more complicated terrain types. Stairs, for example, would have been used to climb up steep mountains. They were removed during the late development stages. Players would have to develop their robots literally from the ground up in the unfinished version while robot models were already fully assembled in the finished version.

References

1991 video games
Game Gear games
Game Gear-only games
Japan-exclusive video games
Masaya Games games
Video games about mecha
Side-scrolling video games
Strategy video games
Top-down video games
Multiplayer and single-player video games
Video games about robots
Video games developed in Japan
Video games scored by Noriyuki Iwadare